Llandaff North, is a district, community and coterminous electoral ward in the north of Cardiff, the capital city of Wales.

Description
It is located in the north of Cardiff and can be considered a two-part ward, each containing about half the population; a northern section of mainly middle class housing, and a southern section commonly known as the Gabalfa housing estate which consists of public sector and former public sector housing stock. When the Community Charge (or Poll Tax) was introduced in 1990 the Gabalfa housing estate and also parts of the Mynachdy housing estate were placed into the new Llandaff North Electoral Ward, and the boundaries of the Gabalfa Electoral Ward were moved and redrawn to create a now separate ward to the south east of the new Llandaff North ward. This new Gabalfa ward still includes the Gabalfa Interchange and also some parts of Mynachdy, but no longer includes any of the Gabalfa housing estate. It is understood that these changes, which still remain controversial to this day, were brought about so that residents of Gabalfa and Mynachdy could then be charged the much higher rate of Poll Tax which was then being levied on anyone who was "a resident of Llandaff North". Llandaff North is located directly north of Llandaff but is an electoral ward which falls within the wider parliamentary constituency of Cardiff North. This constituency is known as a key marginal and is one of a handful within the United Kingdom which is decisive in a British General Election. Being mainly middle-class and "swing voters" the residents of Llandaff North are of some interest to national politicians.

Llandaff North is quite a small and quiet residential area which is served by a number of village shops, including cafes, a pharmacy and an artisan bakery. The south-western boundary of Llandaff North is formed by the River Taff which also separates Llandaff North from Llandaff. These two areas are linked by a road bridge which spans this river, where Llandaff Rowing Club is located, and which also provides a view of Llandaff Cathedral. The Welsh name, Ystum Taf, means "bend in the River Taff".

Llandaff North is also home to Hailey Park along the River Taff, with large playing fields, tennis courts and two children's playgrounds.  The land that became Hailey Park was originally donated by Claude Hailey.

History
Llandaff North, along with Llandaff, was incorporated into Cardiff in 1922.
Population (June 1999) = 8,250  (Cardiff Research Centre Estimate)
Population (mid-2007) = 7,778 (Cardiff Research Centre Estimate, based on Office for National Statistics figures)
Population (2011)     = 8,344 (United Kingdom Census)

Schools
Hawthorn Junior School and Hawthorn Infant School were amalgamated in June 2009 on the Infant school site to form Hawthorn Primary School, with large investment into new buildings and facilities.  In 2016 Hawthorn Primary School was one of the most over-subscribed schools in Cardiff.

Cardiff Steiner School is an independent school that is part of the Steiner Waldorf education movement, with pupils from 3 to 18. It opened in 2013 in the former Hawthorn Junior School building.

Ysgol Gyfun Gymraeg Glantaf is a state secondary school based on the outskirts of Llandaff North. It is a Welsh-medium comprehensive school of non-denominational religion which serves some children from Llandaff North and from across south Wales.

Whitchurch High School is a state secondary school based in the Whitchurch area of Cardiff. It is an English-medium comprehensive school of non-denominational religion which serves the majority of state educated children in Llandaff North.

The Cathedral School is a preparatory and secondary school based in the Llandaff area of Cardiff. It is an independent boarding and day school which has strong links with Llandaff Cathedral. Parents in Llandaff North wanting to educate their children privately (but locally) send their children to this school.

Facilities

Llandaff North Medical Centre is a modern purpose built surgery constructed in 1997. Llandaff North Community Centre is centre for people to arrange meetings and mostly used for Old Aged Pensioner's Bingo. Hawthorn Junior School was closed in 2009 and Hawthorn Infant School has now incorporated the juniors section with large investment into new buildings and facilities. Llandaff North Library is located on Gabalfa Avenue.

Electoral ward
Llandaff North is both an electoral ward, and a community of the City of Cardiff.  There is no community council for the area.

The electoral ward of Llandaff North falls within the parliamentary constituency of Cardiff North.  It is bounded by the wards of Radyr & Morganstown to the northwest; Whitchurch & Tongwynlais to the north; Heath to the northeast; Gabalfa to the east; Rhiwbina to the southwest; and Llandaff to the south.

Transport

Llandaf railway station serves the area with services northbound to Treherbert, Merthyr Tydfil or Aberdare via Radyr and Pontypridd. Southbound services operate to Cardiff Central via Cardiff Queen Street.

Cardiff Bus services 24 (Llandaff-Pontcanna-Central Station) and 25 (Whitchurch-Birchgrove-Gabalfa-Cathays-Central Station) run frequently through the area.

Station Road leads north from Llandaff North towards Coryton and the M4 J32 Cardiff North. Bridge Road leads south into Llandaff and the city centre.

Sports Clubs
Llandaff North RFC
Llandaff Rowing Club – A sports rowing club based on the Llandaf bank of the River Taff, which uses the stretch of the river that forms the southern boundary of Llandaff North.

References

External links
Whitchurch And Llandaff North Web Site

Communities in Cardiff
Cardiff electoral wards